Qeshlaq-e Sardar Eshraf (also Romanized as Qeshlāq-e Sardār Eshraf; also known as Qeshlāq) is a village in Kivanat Rural District, Kolyai District, Sonqor County, Kermanshah Province, Iran. At the 2006 census, its population was 86, in 23 families.

References 

Populated places in Sonqor County